In photometry, luminous flux or luminous power is the measure of the perceived power of light. It differs from radiant flux, the measure of the total power of electromagnetic radiation (including infrared, ultraviolet, and visible light), in that luminous flux is adjusted to reflect the varying sensitivity of the human eye to different wavelengths of light.

Units
The SI unit of luminous flux is the lumen (lm). One lumen is defined as the luminous flux of light produced by a light source that emits one candela of luminous intensity over a solid angle of one steradian.

In other systems of units, luminous flux may have units of power.

Weighting
The luminous flux accounts for the sensitivity of the eye by weighting the power at each wavelength with the luminosity function, which represents the eye's response to different wavelengths. The luminous flux is a weighted sum of the power at all wavelengths in the visible band. Light outside the visible band does not contribute. The ratio of the total luminous flux to the radiant flux is called the luminous efficacy.

Context
Luminous flux is often used as an objective measure of the useful light emitted by a light source, and is typically reported on the packaging for light bulbs, although it is not always prominent. Consumers commonly compare the luminous flux of different light bulbs since it provides an estimate of the apparent amount of light the bulb will produce, and a lightbulb with a higher ratio of luminous flux to consumed power is more efficient.

Luminous flux is not used to compare brightness, as this is a subjective perception which varies according to the distance from the light source and the angular spread of the light from the source.

Relationship to luminous intensity 

Luminous flux (in lumens) is a measure of the total amount of light a lamp puts out. The luminous intensity (in candelas) is a measure of how bright the beam in a particular direction is. If a lamp has a 1 lumen bulb and the optics of the lamp are set up to focus the light evenly into a 1 steradian beam, then the beam would have a luminous intensity of 1 candela. If the optics were changed to concentrate the beam into 1/2 steradian then the source would have a luminous intensity of 2 candela. The resulting beam is narrower and brighter, however the luminous flux remains the same.

Examples

References

Physical quantities
Photometry
Temporal rates